Michael Coleman Talbot (September 29, 1953 – May 27, 1992) was an American author of several books highlighting parallels between ancient mysticism and quantum mechanics, and espousing a theoretical model of reality that suggests the physical universe is akin to a hologram based on the research and conclusions of David Bohm and Karl H. Pribram. According to Talbot ESP, telepathy, and other paranormal phenomena are a product of this holographic model of reality.

Early life
Talbot was born in Grand Rapids, Michigan, on September 29, 1953, and grew up in Lowell, a nearby small town.  He attended Michigan State University from 1971 to 1974 where he pursued an eclectic education. While he did quite a bit of writing at the time, he was also engaged in many other efforts.  He taught himself how to play the piano by locking himself in piano rooms for long periods. He was a great fan of Scriabin. He spent quite a bit of time painting, and made friends with faculty in Art History to discuss art and culture.  As a young man he had a great interest in the occult, which allowed him to spend hours entertaining small groups of friends with tales of poltergeists, UFOs, etc.

Career
He was originally a fiction and science fiction author. He also contributed articles to The Village Voice and other publications.

Talbot attempted to incorporate spirituality, religion and science to shed light on profound questions. His non-fiction books include Mysticism And The New Physics, Beyond The Quantum, and The Holographic Universe (freely available at the Internet Archive).

Personal life and death
Talbot was openly gay and lived with his boyfriend. In 1992, Talbot died of lymphocytic leukemia at age 38.

Bibliography
Novels
 The Delicate Dependency, 1982 (reprinted in 2014 by Valancourt Books), 
 The Bog, 1986 (reprinted in 2015 by Valancourt Books)
 Night Things, 1988 (reprinted in 2015 by Valancourt Books)

Non-fiction
 Mysticism And The New Physics, 1980 (rev. 1992)
 Beyond The Quantum, 1986  
 Your Past Lives - A Reincarnation Handbook, 1987, 
 The Holographic Universe, 1991

See also

 Holographic principle
 Holonomic brain theory

References

External links
 Synchronicity and the Holographic Universe (Interview on Thinking Allowed) 
 A review of "The Holographic Universe" (includes Talbot's Introduction to the book)
 Michael Talbot on Holographic Universe on YouTube Video
 The Delicate Dependency at Valancourt Books

1953 births
1992 deaths
20th-century American novelists
American male novelists
American science writers
Deaths from leukemia
American gay writers
New Age writers
Parapsychologists
Writers from Grand Rapids, Michigan
Quantum mysticism advocates
American LGBT novelists
LGBT people from Michigan
Novelists from Michigan
American male non-fiction writers
20th-century American male writers
Deaths from cancer in New York (state)
20th-century LGBT people